The men's 20 km individual biathlon competition of the Pyeongchang 2018 Olympics was held on 15 February 2018 at the Alpensia Biathlon Centre in Pyeongchang, South Korea.

Qualification

Schedule
All times are (UTC+9).

Results
The race was started at 20:20.

References

Individual